Peter O'Brian may refer to:

Peter O'Brian (actor), New Zealand/Indonesian actor
Peter O'Brian (film producer) (born 1947), Canadian film producer

See also
Peter O'Brien (disambiguation)